Heorhiy Mykolayovych Bushchan (born 31 May 1994) is a Ukrainian professional footballer who plays as a goalkeeper for Dynamo Kyiv in the Ukrainian Premier League.

Club career
Heorhiy began playing football in Odesa, where he attended Chornomorets Odesa football school. When he was fourteen, Bushchan moved to Kyiv, where he began playing for Dynamo Kyiv youth and reserve squads. 
He was a part of Dynamo's first team squad on and off from the 2011–12 season onwards. He made his debut until 20 August 2017, when he helped his team to a 4–1 Ukrainian Premier League victory over Stal Kamianske at NSC "Olimpiyskiy". On 2 November 2017, he made his UEFA Europa League debut in a 1–0 victory over Young Boys Bern at Stade de Suisse. In the 2019–20 season, Bushchan established himself as Dynamo's first-choice goalkeeper.

International career
He made his debut for the Ukraine national team on 7 October 2020 in a friendly against France, a 7–1 away loss. He made his competitive debut three days later in a Nations League game against Germany. Three days later, on 13 October 2020, he recorded his first international clean sheet in a 1–0 home victory over Spain.

Career statistics

Club

International

Honours
Dynamo Kyiv
Ukrainian Premier League: 2020–21; runner-up: 2017–18, 2018–19, 2019–20
Ukrainian Cup: 2019–20, 2020–21; runner-up: 2017–18
Ukrainian Super Cup: 2018, 2019, 2020; runner-up: 2017, 2021

References

External links
 Club profile
 FPL profile 
 
 

1994 births
Living people
Footballers from Odesa
Ukrainian footballers
Association football goalkeepers
Ukraine international footballers
Ukraine youth international footballers
Ukraine under-21 international footballers
UEFA Euro 2020 players
FC Dynamo Kyiv players
FC Dynamo-2 Kyiv players
Ukrainian Premier League players
Ukrainian First League players